Gerbod the Fleming, of Oosterzele, 1st Earl of Chester, was a hereditary advocate of the Abbey of Saint Bertin at Saint-Omer, Flanders (now France) and Earl of Chester in 1070.

Life
Gerbod of Oosterzele was the son of another Gerbod, hereditary advocate of the abbey of Saint-Bertin. Among the fourteen tenants-in-chief from Flanders, Gerbod the Fleming was one of the most prominent. His family held the lordships of Oosterzele and Scheldewindeke, the overlordship of Arques and territorial rights in Saint-Omer. 

In 1066, he was in the service of William the Conqueror, most probably at the battle of Hastings, and, between 1067 and 1070, was created Earl of Chester, holding a large portion of that county along with the city of Chester forming the county palatine of Chester. His brother, Frederic, was a tenant-in-chief in East Anglia and his sister Gundred married William I de Warenne, later 1st Earl of Surrey, whose caput was Castle Acre in Norfolk.

Gerbod was mentioned as being a part of the reduction of Cheshire in 1070 by the Conqueror, at which time Gerbod was given the Earldom of Chester. Orderic Vitalis reports that Gerbod was harassed by both English and Welsh in his new position and he may have been glad to return to Flanders later that same year. This may have been due to concerns having to do with the death of the Count of Flanders, Baldwin VI, and the subsequent civil war.

According to Orderic Vitalis, he fought in the Battle of Cassel in February 1071 in Flanders where he fell into the hands of his enemies and was held captive. William I, seeing the earldom vacant, used his imprisonment as a reason for giving the earldom of Chester to Hugh 'Lupus' d'Avranches. The Hyde Chronicle reported Gerbod died a prisoner. 

However, an English and a Norman source both state that Gerbod was not imprisoned following Cassel, Instead he fled to Rome to seek forgiveness for the sin of killing Arnulf III, Count of Flanders, his liege lord during the battle. Pope Gregory VII sent him to Hugh, Abbot of Cluny. Gerbod remained at Cluny becoming a distinguished monk within its ecclesiastical community.

Prior to becoming a monk, Gerbod married Ada (last name unknown), with whom he had at least three children.

Issue

 Arnulf III of Oosterzele-Scheldewindeke.
 Gerbod III of Oosterzele-Scheldewindeke.
 Albert of Scheldewindeke.

See also
List of Earls in the reign of William the Conqueror

References

Notes

11th-century births
11th-century deaths
11th-century English nobility
Anglo-Normans
Earls of Chester
Nobility of the county of Flanders